This is a list of the named and numbered cavalry regiments of the Canadian Militia from around the start of 1900 until the Otter Commission reforms in 1920.

The full list is as follows:

Permanent Active Militia (Permanent Force)

Non-Permanent Active Militia

References

External links 

 Guide to Sources Relating to the Canadian Militia (Infantry, Cavalry, Armored)
 The Cavalry Regiments of the Canadian Forces: The Volunteer Militia from 1872 -1920
 Cavalry Regiments 1900-1913
 Cavalry Regiments 1914-1939

Canadian Militia
Cavalry regiments of Canada